Henrique Silva Milagres (born 25 April 1994), commonly known as Henrique, is a Brazilian professional footballer who plays as a left-back for Ligue 1 club Lyon.

Career

Vasco da Gama 
Henrique joined Vasco da Gama in 2003. He played for the club's senior side from 2013 to 2021, making a total of 192 appearances and scoring 1 goal across all competitions.

Lyon 
On 29 June 2021, Henrique signed a three-year contract with Ligue 1 club Lyon.

Career statistics

References

External links

 Profile at the Olympique Lyonnais website
 Henrique at ZeroZero

1994 births
Living people
Brazilian footballers
Association football fullbacks
Campeonato Brasileiro Série A players
Ligue 1 players
Championnat National 2 players
CR Vasco da Gama players
Olympique Lyonnais players
Brazilian expatriate footballers
Expatriate footballers in France
Brazilian expatriate sportspeople in France
Footballers from Rio de Janeiro (city)